Halil is a common Turkish male given name. It is equivalent to the Arabic given name and surname Khalil or its variant Khaleel.

Notable persons with the name include:

 Halil Akbunar (born 1993), Turkish footballer
 Halil Akkaş (born 1983), Turkish middle distance runner
 Halil Akıncı (born 1945), Turkish diplomat
 Halil Altındere (born 1971), Turkish artist
 Halil Altıntop (born 1982), Turkish footballer
 Halil Asani (born 1974), Serbian footballer
 Halil Bajramović (born 1971), Bosnian businessman
 Halil Berktay (born 1947), Turkish historian
 Halil Sami Bey (1866–1925), Ottoman Army colonel
 Halil Bıçakçı (born 1926), Turkish football manager
 Halil Çolak (born 1988), Turkish footballer
 Halil Dervişoğlu (born 1999), Dutch footballer of Turkish descent
 Halil Sezai Erkut (1908–1988), Turkish government minister and politician
 Halil Ergün (born 1946), Turkish actor
 Halil Gür (born 1951), Dutch author of Turkish origin
 Halil Güven (born 1956), American professor and university administrator of Turkish Cypriot descent
 Halil İbrahim Eren (born 1956), Turkish footballer
 Halil İnalcık (born 1916), Turkish historian
 Halil Jaganjac (born 1998), Croatian handball player
 Halil Jaçellari (1940–2009), Albanian writer and translator
 Halil Kanacević (born 1991), American-born Montenegrin basketball player
 Halil Kaya (1920–?), Turkish Olympic sport wrestler
 Halil Kut (1881–1957), Ottoman-born Turkish regional governor, military commander and genocide perpetrator
 Halil Köse (born 1997), Belgian-born Turkish footballer
 Halil Menteşe (1874–1948), Turkish government minister, politician and genocide perpetrator
 Halil Suleyman Ozerden (born 1966), American lawyer and judge
 Halil Pasha (disambiguation), several people
 Halil Mete Soner, Turkish-American mathematician and academic
 Halil Mutlu (born 1973), Bulgarian-Turkish Olympic weightlifter
 Halil Mutlu (politics), Turkish-born physician, political lobbyist and community activist living in the USA
 Halil Mëniku (died 1967), Albanian politician and publisher
 Halil Savda (born 1974), Turkish conscientious objector
 Halil Savran (born 1985), Turkish-German footballer
 Halil Tikveša (born 1935), Bosnian painter
 Halil Uysal (1973–2008), Turkish journalist and film director
 Halil Yeral (born 2000), Turkish footballer
 Halil Zeybek (born 1985), Turkish footballer
 Halil Zorba (born 1988), British weightlifter
 Halil Zıraman (1927–1984), Turkish javelin thrower
 Halil Çolak (born 1988), Turkish footballer
 Halil Ürün (born 1968), Turkish politician
 Halil İnalcık (1916–2016), Turkish historian

See also

Halili (name)
Khalil (disambiguation)
Khalil (name)

Turkish masculine given names